Luke Watson (born 1983) is a South African rugby union player.

Luke Watson may also refer to:

Luke Watson (distance runner) (born 1980), American long-distance runner
Luke Watson (sprinter) (born 1957), British sprinter

See also
Luke Wilson (born 1971), American actor
Luke (name)
Watson (surname)